Crébillon is a French surname. Notable people with that name include:
 Prosper Jolyot de Crébillon (1674–1762), French poet and tragedian
 Claude Prosper Jolyot de Crébillon (1707–1777), French novelist and son of the above

French-language surnames